Turbinella is a genus of very large sea snails with an operculum, marine gastropod mollusks in the subfamily Turbinellinae of the family Turbinellidae.

These species are sometimes known as "chanks" or "chank shells". One species in this genus is the sacred chank, Turbinella pyrum; see "Shankha" for the cultural and religious use of the shell of that species.

Distribution
Species in this genus are found worldwide, mostly in tropical shallow waters.

Description
Most species have massive shells with three or four prominent columellar plicae.

Species

Species within the genus Turbinella include:
 Turbinella angulata (Lightfoot, 1786)
 Turbinella fusus Sowerby, 1825 
 Turbinella laevigata Anton, 1838
 Turbinella laffertyi Kilburn, 1975
 Turbinella ponderosa (Lightfoot, 1786)
 Turbinella pyrum Linnaeus, 1758 - the sacred chank or shankha
 Turbinella rapa Lamarck, 1816
 †Turbinella regina Heilprin, 1886 
 Turbinella wheeleri Petuch, 1994 
Species brought into synonymy 
 Turbinella armata Broderip, 1833: synonym of Vasum armatum (Broderip, 1833)
 Turbinella armigera Lesson, 1842 : synonym of Reishia armigera (Link, 1807)
 Turbinella cassiformis Kiener, 1840: synonym of Vasum cassiforme (Kiener, 1840)
 Turbinella cornigera Lamarck, 1822: synonym of Vasum turbinellus (Linnaeus, 1758)
 Turbinella crenulata Kiener, 1840: synonym of Peristernia chlorostoma (G. B. Sowerby I, 1825)
 Turbinella globulus Lamarck, 1816: synonym of Vasum globulus (Lamarck, 1816)
 Turbinella leucozonalis Lamarck, 1822: synonym of Leucozonia leucozonalis (Lamarck, 1822)
 Turbinella mitis Lamarck, 1822: synonym of Vasum capitellum (Linnaeus, 1758)
 Turbinella nuttingi Henderson, 1919: synonym of Vasum globulus (Lamarck, 1816)
 Turbinella pugillaris Lamarck, 1822: synonym of Vasum muricatum (Born, 1778)
 Turbinella tuberculata Broderip, 1833 : synonym of Leucozonia tuberculata (Broderip, 1833)
 Turbinella tubifera Anton, 1838: synonym of Vasum tubiferum (Anton, 1838)
 Turbinella variolaris Lamarck, 1822: synonym of Vasum turbinellus (Linnaeus, 1758)

Species inquirenda
 Turbinella tuberculata Anton, 1838 (species inquirenda, Invalid: junior homonym of Turbinella tuberculata Broderip, 1833)

References

External links 
 Lamarck, J.B.M. (1799). Prodrome d'une nouvelle classification des coquilles, comprenant une rédaction appropriée des caractères géneriques, et l'établissement d'un grand nombre de genres nouveaux. Mémoires de la Société d'Histoire Naturelle de Paris. 1: 63-91
 Perry, G. (1811). Conchology, or the natural history of shells: containing a new arrangement of the genera and species, illustrated by coloured engravings executed from the natural specimens, and including the latest discoveries. 4 pp., 61 plates. London.
 Lamarck, J. B. (1801). Système des animaux sans vertèbres, ou tableau général des classes, des ordres et des genres de ces animaux; Présentant leurs caractères essentiels et leur distribution, d'apres la considération de leurs rapports naturels et de leur organisation, et suivant l'arrangement établi dans les galeries du Muséum d'Histoire Naturelle, parmi leurs dépouilles conservées; Précédé du discours d'ouverture du Cours de Zoologie, donné dans le Muséum National d'Histoire Naturelle l'an 8 de la République. Published by the author and Deterville, Paris: viii + 432 pp.
 Röding, P. F. (1798). Museum Boltenianum sive Catalogus cimeliorum e tribus regnis naturæ quæ olim collegerat Joa. Fried Bolten, M. D. p. d. per XL. annos proto physicus Hamburgensis. Pars secunda continens Conchylia sive Testacea univalvia, bivalvia & multivalvia. Trapp, Hamburg. viii, 199 pp

Turbinellidae